Tallheo is the location of a former village of the Nuxalk known as Talyu, and is a former cannery town near Bella Coola, British Columbia, Canada, on North Bentinck Arm.  Tallheo is also the name of the dialect of the Nuxalk language spoken by the Talhyumc, the particular subgroup of the Nuxalk who live there.

In 1905 the Tallheo Cannery was started by a Norwegian immigrant, a member of the block settlement at what became Hagensborg in the Bella Coola Valley nearby, employing members of the Talhiyumc and local Norwegian-Canadian community and many others.  The cannery specialized in sockeye, coho, pink, chum, and spring salmon and was owned by the Canadian Fishing Company, whose headquarters were in Vancouver.

Once a thriving community, Tallheo Cannery now operates as a bed and breakfast.

Tallheo should not be confused with Tallheo Hot Springs, which is located on the west bank of South Bentinck Arm.

See also
List of canneries in British Columbia

References

Tallheo Cannery, Bella Coola Valley website

External links
Gallery of Tallheo Cannery & Bella Coola by natvdotr at Webshots
Photos of Tallheo Cannery

Unincorporated settlements in British Columbia
Nuxalk
Central Coast of British Columbia
Populated places in the Central Coast Regional District
Ghost towns in British Columbia
Norwegian Canadian settlements